The Ohio University Women's Center is part of the Office of Diversity, Access and Equity at Ohio University in Athens, Ohio. The Women's Center opened in February 2007 with the opening of the university's John Calhoun Baker University Center. The Women's Center aims to educate about and advocate for women, gender, and diversity among the university community.

Staff 
The Women's Center has two full-time employees. Each year the center hires several undergraduate students, including work study and PACE positions. The center also hires a graduate assistant and practicum students, and has a volunteer program.

Programming 

Walk a Mile in Her Shoes During Walk a Mile in Her Shoes, male participants walk a mile on campus in women's shoes to raise awareness about the role men play in preventing sexual assault. The Women's Center has participated in Walk a Mile in Her Shoes since 2008.

Love Your Body Day Love Your Body Day is a national campaign that stresses the importance of positive body image. The Women's Center has participated since 2008, and encourages women to write down and share what they love about their bodies and holds a symposium in the evening featuring different speakers followed by an indulgence party, where attendees bring a favorite dish to share.

International Women's Day International Women's Day is a festival that is celebrated nationally every year on the Sunday closest to March 8. The Women's Center began participating in International Women's Day in 2009. The center encourages campus community to highlight women's and girl's achievements and to reflect on the status of women.

References

External links 
 Ohio University Women's Center 
 Walk a Mile in Her Shoes 
 Love Your Body Day from the National Organization for Women website

 

Ohio University
Women's organizations based in the United States
2007 establishments in Ohio
Women in Ohio